Ceratias is a small genus of seadevils.

Species
There are currently three recognized species in this genus:
 Ceratias holboelli Krøyer, 1845 (Krøyer's deep sea angler fish)
 Ceratias tentaculatus Norman, 1930 (southern seadevil)
 Ceratias uranoscopus J. Murray, 1877 (stargazing seadevil)

References

Ceratiidae
Marine fish genera
Taxa named by Henrik Nikolai Krøyer